Cygne was an  16-gun brig of the French Navy, launched in 1806.

Career
The next day, the ships of the squadron were scattered. On 13, Cygne captured the Portuguese ship Miliciano and set her ablaze.

Arriving near [artinique, Cygne was chased by the frigate  (Augustin Collier), the corvette  (George Le Geyt), the brigs  (John Brown),  (Pelham Brenton),  (Thomas Tudor) and the schooner  (William Dowers). On 12 December, Cygne passed the northern cape of Martinique; seeing that he would be overhauled by the British squadron before reaching Saint-Pierre, Menouvrier Defresne decided to drop anchor under a shore battery at Anse Céron.

Two of the British brigs then dropped anchor in positions that cut Cygnes retreat to Saint-Pierre, while the other ships launched boats to attempt a cutting out boarding. Cygne sank three before they reached her. Circe approached with her crew ready for boarding, but was repelled by a grapeshot broadside, while the surviving boats reached Cygnes stern; the party was repelled and 17 men were taken prisoner.

The next day, Cygne found herself becalmed; Defresne attempted to move his ship by having her hauled from the shore by infantrymen and by using her oars, and progressed towards Saint-Pierre, under fire from Amaranthe. However, due to a navigation error, Cygne ran aground and started taking water. As the other British ships closed within range, Defresne ordered Cygne abandoned and scuttled by fire.  Defresne was offered a sword of honour by the city of Saint-Pierre for his defence. As a token of esteem, Brenton gifted him a sword belt, and Lieutenant Hay, a dagger.

The wreck was discovered in 1991 and was explored the next year. A  scale model of the ship is on display at the Musée national de la Marine in Paris.

Notes

Citations

References
  

Age of Sail corvettes of France
Ships built in France
1806 ships
Abeille-class brigs
Captured ships